In the mathematical field of graph theory, the Erdős–Rényi model refers to one of two closely related models for generating random graphs or the evolution of a random network. These models are named after Hungarian mathematicians Paul Erdős and Alfréd Rényi, who introduced one of the models in 1959. Edgar Gilbert introduced the other model contemporaneously and independently of Erdős and Rényi. In the model of Erdős and Rényi, all graphs on a fixed vertex set with a fixed number of edges are equally likely. In the model introduced by Gilbert, also called the Erdős–Rényi–Gilbert model, each edge has a fixed probability of being present or absent, independently of the other edges. These models can be used in the probabilistic method to prove the existence of graphs satisfying various properties, or to provide a rigorous definition of what it means for a property to hold for almost all graphs.

Definition 
There are two closely related variants of the Erdős–Rényi random graph model.

In the  model, a graph is chosen uniformly at random from the collection of all graphs which have  nodes and  edges. The nodes are considered to be labeled, meaning that graphs obtained from each other by permuting the vertices are considered to be distinct. For example, in the  model, there are three two-edge graphs on three labeled vertices (one for each choice of the middle vertex in a two-edge path), and each of these three graphs is included with probability .
In the  model, a graph is constructed by connecting labeled nodes randomly. Each edge is included in the graph with probability , independently from every other edge. In particular, the case  corresponds to the case where all  graphs on  vertices are chosen with equal probability.

The behavior of random graphs are often studied in the case where , the number of vertices, tends to infinity.

Comparison between the two models

For many graph properties, this is the case.  If P is any graph property which is monotone with respect to the subgraph ordering (meaning that if A is a subgraph of B and A satisfies P, then B will satisfy P as well), then the statements "P holds for almost all graphs in G(n, p)" and "P holds for almost all graphs in " are equivalent (provided pn2 → ∞). For example, this holds if P is the property of being connected, or if P is the property of containing a Hamiltonian cycle.  However, this will not necessarily hold for non-monotone properties (e.g. the property of having an even number of edges).

In practice, the G(n, p) model is the one more commonly used today, in part due to the ease of analysis allowed by the independence of the edges.

Properties of G(n, p)
With the notation above, a graph in G(n, p) has on average  edges. The distribution of the degree of any particular vertex is binomial:

 

where n is the total number of vertices in the graph. Since

this distribution is Poisson for large n and np = const.

In a 1960 paper, Erdős and Rényi described the behavior of G(n, p) very precisely for various values of p.  Their results included that:

If np < 1, then a graph in G(n, p) will almost surely have no connected components of size larger than O(log(n)).
If np = 1, then a graph in G(n, p) will almost surely have a largest component whose size is of order n2/3.
If np → c > 1, where c is a constant, then a graph in G(n, p) will almost surely have a unique giant component containing a positive fraction of the vertices.  No other component will contain more than O(log(n)) vertices.
If , then a graph in G(n, p) will almost surely contain isolated vertices, and thus be disconnected.
If , then a graph in G(n, p) will almost surely be connected.

Thus  is a sharp threshold for the connectedness of G(n, p).

Further properties of the graph can be described almost precisely as n tends to infinity.  For example, there is a k(n) (approximately equal to 2log2(n)) such that the largest clique in G(n, 0.5) has almost surely either size k(n) or k(n) + 1.

Thus, even though finding the size of the largest clique in a graph is NP-complete, the size of the largest clique in a "typical" graph (according to this model) is very well understood.

Edge-dual graphs of Erdos-Renyi graphs are graphs with nearly the same degree distribution, but with degree correlations and a significantly higher clustering coefficient.

Relation to percolation
In percolation theory one examines a finite or infinite graph and removes edges (or links) randomly. Thus the Erdős–Rényi process is in fact unweighted link percolation on the complete graph. (One refers to percolation in which nodes and/or links are removed with heterogeneous weights as weighted percolation). As percolation theory has much of its roots in physics, much of the research done was on the lattices in Euclidean spaces. The transition at np = 1 from giant component to small component has analogs for these graphs, but for lattices the transition point is difficult to determine. Physicists often refer to study of the complete graph as a mean field theory. Thus the Erdős–Rényi process is the mean-field case of percolation.

Some significant work was also done on percolation on random graphs. From a physicist's point of view this would still be a mean-field model, so the justification of the research is often formulated in terms of the robustness of the graph, viewed as a communication network. Given a random graph of n ≫ 1 nodes with an average degree . Remove randomly a fraction  of nodes and leave only a fraction  from the network. The relative size of the giant component, P∞, is given by

Caveats
Both of the two major assumptions of the G(n, p) model (that edges are independent and that each edge is equally likely) may be inappropriate for modeling certain real-life phenomena. Erdős–Rényi graphs have low clustering, unlike many social networks. Some modeling alternatives include Barabási–Albert model and Watts and Strogatz model. These alternative models are not percolation processes, but instead represent a growth and rewiring model, respectively.

History 
The G(n, p) model was first introduced by Edgar Gilbert in a 1959 paper studying the connectivity threshold mentioned above.  The G(n, M) model was introduced by Erdős and Rényi in their 1959 paper.  As with Gilbert, their first investigations were as to the connectivity of G(n, M), with the more detailed analysis following in 1960.

Continuum limit representation of critical  

A continuum limit of the graph was obtained when  is of order . The limit object can be constructed as follows:

 First, generate a diffusion  where  is a standard Brownian motion.
 From this process, we define the reflected process . This process can be seen as containing many successive excursion (not quite a Brownian excursion, see ).
 Now, consider an excursion . Construct a random graph as follows:
 Construct a real tree  (see Brownian tree).
To each point  such that , corresponds an underlying internal node and a leaf of the tree . Identifying the two vertices, the tree  becomes a graph 

Applying this procedure, one obtains a sequence of random infinite graphs of decreasing sizes: .

See also
, the graph formed by extending the G(n, p) model to graphs with a countably infinite number of vertices. Unlike in the finite case, the result of this infinite process is (with probability 1) the same graph, up to isomorphism.
 describes ways in which properties associated with the Erdős–Rényi model contribute to the emergence of order in systems.
 describe a general probability distribution of graphs on "n" nodes given a set of network statistics and various parameters associated with them.
 , a generalization of the Erdős–Rényi model for graphs with latent community structure

References

Literature

Weblinks 
 Video: Erdos-Renyi Random Graph

Random graphs
Renyi model